Arabs in India are people with Arab origins who have over a long period of time, settled in the Indian subcontinent. There have been extensive trade and cultural links between India and the Arab world spanning several millennia. The west coast region of India, especially Malabar and Konkan coasts were active trading hubs, where Arab merchants frequently used to visit on their way to  Sri Lanka and South East Asia. Over a span of several centuries, migrants from different Arabian nations immigrated to various regions and kingdoms of the Indian subcontinent as merchants, missionaries and through intermarriages.

Communities
The earliest immigrants from the Arab world arrived as merchants to the Malabar coastal region of South West India, today consisting of the state of Kerala. Many of these Arab merchants intermarried with local women. Concentrations of these mixed-race descendants of Arab merchants can be found especially in the Kozhikode and Malappuram districts of Kerala. There also have been historic and close links between the Orthodox churches of South-West India and the Christian Arab orthodox churches in the middle east for several centuries, especially among the Orthodox Christians in India and Syria, which they maintain until this day and many of the Christians from these communities have claimed their ancestors are Arabs and the DNA results support this claim with Haplogroup G-M201 and Haplogroup J-M304 being prominent.

Descendants of Arabs also live in the villages of Variav and Rander in Gujarat.  In Hyderabad, Chaush are an Arab community of Hadhrami descent whose ancestors were recruited as soldiers by Nizam of Hyderabad. In coastal Karnataka, a group of Persian speaking Sunni Muslims from Iraq having Assadi surname arrived in Mangalore during the reign of Tipu Sultan. They claim their ancestry from Banu Assad. These population migrations may have been favoured by both the Nizam of Hyderabad and Tipu Sultan of Mysore because both had their ancestral linkages to these populations. The Asaf Jahi Dynasty claimed Arab ancestry from Asir Province and Tipu Sultan from the Bani Hashim of Hijaz Province in Arabia. Many Arabs having Adnani ancestry such as Quraishi, Ansari tribes and other descendants of the Sahaba were employed by the Princely States in their military as they were found efficient during warfare in Gujarat and Karnataka. In Kerala, Syed Thangals of Hadhrami descent settled around the 17th century as missionaries to propagate Islam.

There are also Shia Sayyids in the Northern region of the country who claim descent from Wasit, Iraq like Zaidis although some are falsely claiming this ancestry. Sunni Sayyid of the country also claim Arab descent from Sufi missionaries. Most of the Sufis migrated from Persia. Sunni Sayyids claim their Arab ancestry through Imam Hassan or Imam Hussain, in which case their names may be Hassani, Hussaini, Hashmi, Naqvi and Bukhari. Some also claim descent from both and are termed "Najeeb al-Tarfayn" or "Noble on both sides". Many Sufi Saints such as Abdul-Qadir Gilani and Moinuddin Chishti and their descendants claim themselves as Najeeb al-Tarfayn however some claim this descent falsely. Sunni Sheikhs also claim Arab descent from Sufis or migrants. They belongs Quraish tribe and trace lineage from Umar – Farooqi, Abu Bakr- Siddiqui, Uthman – Usmani and Alvi – Alawi , Alvi Awan or Mir, who established the Rashidun Caliphate. Mainly Sheikhs who trace their lineage to Quraish tribe are Quraishi. Many who can vaguely trace their lineage to the Quraish tribe call themselves Quraishi. Many having the name Ansari claim their lineage to the Ansar tribes of Madina Munawwara and the companions of the Islamic prophet Muhammad such as Abu Ayyub al-Ansari. Many of the present Sheikhs converted from Hindu castes such as Kayasth and Rajput.

There are also descendants of Syed Jalaluddin Surkh-Posh Bukhari  and through his grandson Syed Jahaniyan Jahangsht, who can trace their lineage to the Twelve Imams from the lineage of Imam Ali al-Hadi (known as Imam Naqi). The Sufi Saint Jalaludin Surkh Posh settled in modern-day Punjab to spread Islam.

During the early twentieth century, the Arabs abandoned Arabic for Urdu. Each clan is of equal status, but the Quraishis are accorded seniority on account of the fact that they were from the tribe of the Prophet Muhammad.
The community have remained strictly endogenous, with virtually no cases of intermarriage with native Indian ethnolinguistic communities such as the Gujaratis.

Arab ancestry among Indians 
It is estimated that several groups in India have Middle Eastern Arab ancestry. Especially Muslim groups and various populations in western India have at least some Arab ancestry. Genetic analyses show that Arab and other West Asian lineages are quite common in Indians.

See also
 India–Saudi Arabia relations
 India–United Arab Emirates relations
 Arab diaspora
 Adnani Arabs
 Chaush (India)

References 

Social groups of Gujarat
Muslim communities of India
Muslim communities of Gujarat
Ethnic groups in India
 
Arab groups
Hadhrami people